Castellanos is a locality in Santa Fe Province in northeastern Argentina.

References

Populated places in Santa Fe Province